Nudaria albipunctella is a moth of the family Erebidae first described by George Hampson in 1914. It is found on Borneo, Sumatra and Peninsular Malaysia.

References

Nudariina
Moths described in 1914